The Kansas Dental Board (KDB) is the state agency regulating dentistry. Its headquarters are in Room 564-S in the Landon State Office Building in Topeka.

Board Members
 Glenn Hemberger, D.D.S. (President)
 Charles Squire, D.D.S. (vice-president)
 Susan Rodgers, R.D.H. (Secretary)
 Scott Hamilton, D.D.S.
 Jarrod Jones, D.D.S.
 Donna Thomas, D.D.S.
 Jeff Stasch, D.D.S.
 Jackie Leakey, R.D.H.
 Jim Showalter, C.P.A. (Public Member)

References

External links

 Official Website
 Kansas State Dental Board Newsletter (KGI Online Library)
 Kansas State Dental Board Meeting Minutes (KGI Online Library)

State agencies of Kansas
Medical and health organizations based in Kansas
Dental organizations based in the United States